Gluckman Tang Architects, (previously Gluckman Mayner Architects), is a New York City based architecture firm providing services in architecture, planning, and interior design. Established by Richard Gluckman in 1977, the firm is known for it's minimalist design approach.

Richard Gluckman 

Richard Gluckman, FAIA, has led museum projects worldwide, including the Cooper Hewitt, Smithsonian Design Museum (2014), Philadelphia Museum of Art, Perelman Building (2007), the downtown location of the Museum of Contemporary Art, San Diego (2007), Museo Picasso in Málaga, Spain (2004), Mori Art Museum in Tokyo, Japan (2003), the renovation and expansion of the Whitney Museum in New York (1998), Georgia O'Keeffe Museum in Santa Fe, New Mexico (1996), and the Andy Warhol Museum in Pittsburgh (1994). Described as a “maker of precisely silent frames”, Gluckman's modernist aesthetic is informed by the functionalist simplicity of early 20th-century industrial structures of his hometown Buffalo, NY, specifically grain elevators.

Gluckman's involvement with New York minimalist architecture began in the late 1970s with the design of an Upper East Side residence for Heiner Friedrich and Philippa de Menil, founders of the Dia Art Foundation. His reputation as the “artists’ architect” grew in 1987 with the renovation of a four-story reinforced concrete warehouse into Dia Center for the Arts, and solidified in the mid-1990s following his conversion of five early 20th-century industrial spaces in Chelsea for gallerists Larry Gagosian, Mary Boone, and Paula Cooper. He has completed homes and studios for artists including Chuck Close (in Water Mill, New York), Francesco Clemente (Greenpoint, Brooklyn), Don Gummer (Long Island City, Queens), Ellsworth Kelly (Spencertown, New York), Louise Lawler (Clinton Hill, Brooklyn) and Richard Serra (Nova Scotia, Canada), and collaborated on site-specific installations with artists Walter de Maria (New York Earth Room, 1977, Broken Kilometer, 1979) and Jenny Holzer.

Gluckman received his bachelor of architecture and master of architecture from Syracuse University. He has held visiting critic and lecturer positions at universities including Harvard, Columbia, and Syracuse, and most recently an architecture residency at the American Academy in Rome (2017). Additionally, Gluckman has served on various boards including the Andy Warhol Foundation for the Visual Arts and the Van Alen Institute, and as chair of the Architectural Advisory Board for Syracuse University.

Dana Tang 
With the firm for about 20 years prior, Dana Tang became a partner in 2015. In recent years, Tang has spearheaded the firm's presence in China, securing and leading the design of three major museums in Shanghai and Hangzhou. In addition to a master's degree in Architecture from Yale University, Tang holds a master's degree in Asian Studies, with an emphasis on Chinese culture and history.

Recognition
Two monographs of the firm's work have been published by The Monacelli Press: Framework: Gluckman Mayner Architects (2009) and Space Framed: Richard Gluckman Architect (2000).

Gluckman Tang Architects has received a number of awards from the American Institute of Architects, including a 2017 AIA Small Projects Award, a 2017 AIANY Honor Award for Architecture, an AIANYS Honor Award and Building Type Award in 2017 and 2008, a 2007 AIANYS Design Award for Architecture, and a 2007 AIA College Committee Honor Award for Excellence in Architecture.

In 2005, Richard Gluckman was presented with a National Design Award from the Cooper-Hewitt, National Design Museum. He was also inducted into the Interior Design Hall of Fame in 1999.

Selected projects

 Staten Island Museum (2015) - New York, NY
 Cooper-Hewitt, National Design Museum (2014) - New York, NY
 Syracuse University College of Law, Dineen Hall (2014) - Syracuse, NY
 Museum of Contemporary Art San Diego (2007) - San Diego, CA
 Philadelphia Museum of Art - Ruth and Raymond G. Perelman Building (2007) - Philadelphia, PA
 Museo Picasso Málaga (2004) - Málaga, Spain
 The Mori Arts Center, including The Mori Art Museum (2003) - Tokyo, Japan
 Georgia O'Keeffe Museum (1997) - Santa Fe, NM
 Andy Warhol Museum (1994) - Pittsburgh, PA
 Dia Center for the Arts (1987) - New York, NY

References

Architecture firms based in New York City
Companies based in Manhattan
Design companies established in 1977
1977 establishments in New York (state)